Anthony Bernard Carter (born June 16, 1975) is an American basketball coach and former player who is an assistant coach for the Miami Heat. He played college basketball for Saddleback College and Hawaii.

Early life
Born in Milwaukee, Carter played as a freshman on the varsity team of Alonzo A. Crim High School in Atlanta. However, after his freshman year, Carter quit high school. After leaving school, Carter spent his teenage years playing basketball for money in Atlanta. The Rocky Mountain News quoted Carter stating:  "The dope man would put up the money, and we would play.  We used to play for the drug dealers. That's how we were going to make our money. We didn't sell the drugs ... (I used the money) to buy shoes and food.  That was the only way we could eat." During his teenage years, Carter's mother was on drugs, and all seven of his uncles were at one point in prison.

Realizing Carter's basketball skills could earn him an education, several members of Carter's community helped him get a GED and enroll in college.

College career
Carter played collegiately at Saddleback Community College in Mission Viejo, California (1994–96), then went on to play at the University of Hawaii.  At UH, Carter became the Rainbows' career leader in assist average and one of only 10 players to reach 1,000 points.

Professional career
After going undrafted in the 1998 NBA draft, he began his NBA career with the Miami Heat, after having spent one season with CBA's Yakima Sun Kings.

In 2003, Carter's agent failed to notify the Heat that Carter wished to exercise a $4.1 million player option on his contract by the June 30 deadline. The failure allowed the team to renounce their rights to Carter, opening up cap space that was later used to sign Lamar Odom.

Carter later signed with the San Antonio Spurs. However, after only five games, the Spurs waived him due to injury, and he remained inactive throughout 2003–04.

After two relatively uneventful seasons with the Minnesota Timberwolves (2004–06), on April 12, 2007, the Denver Nuggets signed Carter for the remainder of the season, after he started the year with Italy's Scafati Basket. He was waived by the team on August 29, and re-signed two days later.

On December 20, 2007, Carter hit a runner in the lane with 0.8 seconds left in double overtime against the Houston Rockets, which gave the Nuggets a 112–111 win. In that season, he recorded individual records in most statistical categories, averaging a career-high 8 ppg, while starting all but three of the games he appeared in.

On July 1, 2008, Carter became a free agent, but re-signed with Denver in October.

On August 14, 2009, the Nuggets again re-signed Carter to a one-year contract for $1.3 million.

On July 14, 2010, he re-signed with the Nuggets to a one-year contract worth $1.3 million.

On February 22, 2011, Carter was traded to the New York Knicks in a three-way deal which also involved the Minnesota Timberwolves that brought Carmelo Anthony to New York. Considered a throw-in in the trade, Carter forever cemented his place in Knicks lore when he nearly singlehandedly rallied New York to a playoff victory in an elimination game against the Boston Celtics on April 24, 2011. Carter substituted into the game with the Knicks trailing by 23 and brought life back to the Garden by suffocating Rajon Rondo on defense, scoring 11 points, and dishing four dimes. However, the Knicks' comeback bid ultimately fell short.

On December 12, 2011, Carter signed with the Toronto Raptors. He was waived by the Raptors on March 15, 2012. In October 2012, he re-joined the Nuggets for their training camp, but did not make the team's final roster.

Coaching career
In September 2013, Carter was named an assistant coach with the Austin Spurs of the NBA Development League.

On July 31, 2015, Carter was hired by the Sacramento Kings to be an assistant coach.

On September 22, 2016, Carter was named assistant coach for the Sioux Falls Skyforce of the D-League.

On September 21, 2018, Carter was named to the staff of the Heat as player development coach.

Personal life
Carter's son Devin also plays basketball, as of spring 2023 a sophomore guard for the Providence College Friars.

While Carter was in fifth grade at Atlanta's Fred A. Toomer Elementary School, his class was adopted by the "I Have a Dream" foundation. In 2003, he was appointed as the first-ever spokesperson for the foundation.

Carter donated $100,000 to fund scholarships at the University of Hawaii.

NBA career statistics

Regular season 

|-
| align="left" | 
| align="left" | Miami
| 79 || 30 || 23.5 || .395 || .130 || .750 || 2.5 || 4.8 || 1.2 || .1 || 6.3
|-
| align="left" | 
| align="left" | Miami
| 72 || 6 || 22.6 || .406 || .150 || .631 || 2.5 || 3.7 || 1.0 || .1 || 6.4
|-
| align="left" | 
| align="left" | Miami
| 46 || 18 || 22.8 || .342 || .053 || .528 || 2.5 || 4.7 || 1.1 || .1 || 4.3
|-
| align="left" | 
| align="left" | Miami
| 49 || 26 || 18.6 || .356 || .000 || .660 || 1.7 || 4.1 || .9 || .1 || 4.1
|-
| align="left" | 
| align="left" | San Antonio
| 5 || 2 || 17.4 || .297 || .000 || .000 || 2.2 || 2.4 || .8 || .0 || 4.4
|-
| align="left" | 
| align="left" | Minnesota
| 66 || 12 || 11.2 || .407 || .118 || .686 || 1.0 || 2.4 || .5 || .3 || 2.7
|-
| align="left" | 
| align="left" | Minnesota
| 45 || 8 || 13.1 || .387 || .267 || .727 || 1.4 || 2.2 || .5 || .2 || 3.3
|-
| align="left" | 
| align="left" | Denver
| 2 || 0 || 18.5 || .375 || .000 || .000 || 1.5 || 5.5 || .0 || .5 || 3.0
|-
| align="left" | 
| align="left" | Denver
| 70 || 67 || 28.0 || .458 || .349 || .753 || 2.9 || 5.5 || 1.5 || .4 || 7.8
|-
| align="left" | 
| align="left" | Denver
| 78 || 5 || 22.9 || .433 || .239 || .731 || 2.6 || 4.7 || 1.2 || .2 || 5.3
|-
| align="left" | 
| align="left" | Denver
| 54 || 7 || 15.9 || .420 || .270 || .846 || 1.6 || 3.0 || .7 || .2 || 3.3
|-
| align="left" | 
| align="left" | Denver
| 14 || 0 || 10.9 || .333 || .333 || 1.000 || .9 || 1.9 || .6 || .1 || 1.9
|-
| align="left" | 
| align="left" | New York
| 19 || 0 || 16.3 || .461 || .286 || 1.000 || 2.1 || 2.3 || .9 || .3 || 4.4
|-
| align="left" | 
| align="left" | Toronto
| 24 || 0 || 8.7 || .321 || .294 || .800 || 1.4 || 1.4 || .3 || .2 || 2.0
|- class="sortbottom"
| style="text-align:center;" colspan="2"| Career
| 623 || 181 || 19.6 || .404 || .250 || .706 || 2.1 || 3.8 || 1.0 || .2 || 4.8

Playoffs 

|-
| align="left" | 2000
| align="left" | Miami
| 10 || 3 || 27.5 || .416 || .167 || .750 || 4.0 || 5.6 || 1.2 || .2 || 7.7
|-
| align="left" | 2001
| align="left" | Miami
| 3 || 1 || 23.0 || .474 || .000 || .000 || 2.0 || 3.7 || .7 || .3 || 6.0
|-
| align="left" | 2007
| align="left" | Denver
| 1 || 0 || 14.0 || 1.000 || .000 || .000 || 1.0 || 2.0 || .0 || .0 || 8.0
|-
| align="left" | 2008
| align="left" | Denver
| 4 || 1 || 15.3 || .286 || .000 || .000 || 2.5 || 3.5 || .3 || .3 || 2.0
|-
| align="left" | 2009
| align="left" | Denver
| 16 || 0 || 14.3 || .408 || .167 || .500 || 2.0 || 2.1 || .9 || .1 || 2.8
|-
| align="left" | 2010
| align="left" | Denver
| 1 || 0 || 7.0 || .000 || .000 || .000 || .0 || 3.0 || .0 || .0 || .0
|-
| align="left" | 2011
| align="left" | New York
| 4 || 0 || 12.3 || .533 || .333 || 1.000 || 2.0 || 1.5 || .5 || .3 || 4.8
|- class="sortbottom"
| style="text-align:center;" colspan="2"| Career
| 39 || 5 || 18.0 || .430 || .148 || .696 || 2.5 || 3.2 || .8 || .2 || 4.5

References

External links

1975 births
Living people
20th-century African-American sportspeople
21st-century African-American sportspeople
African-American basketball players
American expatriate basketball people in Canada
American expatriate basketball people in Italy
American men's basketball players
Austin Spurs coaches
Austin Toros coaches
Basketball coaches from Georgia (U.S. state)
Basketball coaches from Wisconsin
Basketball players from Atlanta
Basketball players from Milwaukee
Denver Nuggets players
Hawaii Rainbow Warriors basketball players
Miami Heat players
Minnesota Timberwolves players
New York Knicks players
Point guards
Saddleback Gauchos men's basketball players
San Antonio Spurs players
Sacramento Kings assistant coaches
Scafati Basket players
Sioux Falls Skyforce coaches
Sportspeople from Milwaukee
Toronto Raptors players
Undrafted National Basketball Association players
Yakima Sun Kings players